Product design as a verb is to create a new product to be sold by a business to its customers. A very broad coefficient and effective generation and development of ideas through a process that leads to new products. Thus, it is a major aspect of new product development.

Product design process: the set of strategic and tactical activities, from idea generation to commercialization, used to create a product design. In a systematic approach, product designers conceptualize and evaluate ideas, turning them into tangible inventions and products. The product designer's role is to combine art, science, and technology to create new products that people can use. Their evolving role has been facilitated by digital tools that now allow designers to do things that include communicate, visualize, analyze, 3D modeling and actually produce tangible ideas in a way that would have taken greater human resources in the past.

Product design is sometimes confused with (and certainly overlaps with) industrial design, and has recently become a broad term inclusive of service, software, and physical product design. Industrial design is concerned with bringing artistic form and usability, usually associated with craft design and ergonomics, together in order to mass-produce goods. Other aspects of product design and industrial design include engineering design, particularly when matters of functionality or utility (e.g. problem-solving) are at issue, though such boundaries are not always clear.

Product design process
There are various product design processes and many focus on different aspects. One example formulation/model of the process is described by Don Koberg and Jim Bagnellin in "The Seven Universal Stages of Creative Problem-Solving." The process is usually completed by a group of people with different skills and training—e.g. industrial designers, field experts (prospective users), engineers (for engineering design aspects), depending upon the nature and type of the product involved. The process often involves figuring out what is required, brainstorming possible ideas, creating mock prototypes and then generating the product. However, that is not the end. Product designers would still need to execute the idea, making it into an actual product and evaluating its success (seeing if any improvements are necessary).

The product design process has experienced huge leaps in evolution over the last few years with the rise and adoption of 3D printing. New consumer-friendly 3D printers can produce dimensional objects and print upwards with a plastic like substance opposed to traditional printers that spread ink across a page.

The product design process, as expressed by Koberg and Bagnell, typically involves three main aspects:
Analysis
Concept
Synthesis

Depending on the kind of product being designed, the latter two sections are most often revisited (e.g. depending on how often the design needs revision, to improve it or to better fit the criteria). This is a continuous loop, where feedback is the main component. Koberg and Bagnell offer more specifics on the process: In their model, "analysis" consists of two stages, "concept" is only one stage, and "synthesis" encompasses the other four. (These terms notably vary in usage in different design frameworks. Here, they are used in the way they're used by Koberg and Bagnell.)

Analysis
Accept Situation: Here, the designers decide on committing to the project and finding a solution to the problem. They pool their resources into figuring out how to solve the task most efficiently.
Analyze: In this stage, everyone in the team begins research. They gather general and specific materials which will help to figure out how their problem might be solved. This can range from statistics, questionnaires, and articles, among many other sources.

Concept
Define: This is where the key issue of the matter is defined. The conditions of the problem become objectives, and restraints on the situation become the parameters within which the new design must be constructed.

Synthesis
Ideate: The designers here brainstorm different ideas, solutions for their design problem.  The ideal brainstorming session does not involve any bias or judgment, but instead builds on original ideas.
Select: By now, the designers have narrowed down their ideas to a select few, which can be guaranteed successes and from there they can outline their plan to make the product.
Implement: This is where the prototypes are built, the plan outlined in the previous step is realized and the product starts to become an actual object.
Evaluate: In the last stage, the product is tested, and from there, improvements are made. Although this is the last stage, it does not mean that the process is over. The finished prototype may not work as well as hoped so new ideas need to be brainstormed.

Creative visualization
In design, Creative Visualization refers to the process by which computer generated imagery, digital animation, three-dimensional models, and two-dimensional representations, such as architectural blueprints, engineering drawings, and  sewing patterns are created and used in order to visualize a potential product prior to production. Such products include prototypes for vehicles in automotive engineering, apparel in the fashion industry, and buildings in architectural design.

Demand-pull innovation and invention-push innovation
Most product designs fall under one of two categories: demand-pull innovation or invention-push innovation.

Demand-pull happens when there is an opportunity in the market to be explored by the design of a product. This product design attempts to solve a design problem. The design solution may be the development of a new product or developing a product that's already on the market, such as developing an existing invention for another purpose.

Invention-push innovation happens when there is an advancement in intelligence. This can occur through research or it can occur when the product designer comes up with a new product design idea.

Product design expression

Design expression comes from the combined effect of all elements in a product. Colour tone, shape and size should direct a person's thoughts towards buying the product. Therefore, it is in the product designer's best interest to consider the audiences who are most likely to be the product's end consumers. Keeping in mind how consumers will perceive the product during the design process will direct towards the product’s success in the market. However, even within a specific audience, it is challenging to cater to each possible personality within that group.

One solution to that is to create a product that, in its designed appearance and function, expresses a personality or tells a story. Products that carry such attributes are more likely to give off a stronger expression that will attract more consumers. On that note it is important to keep in mind that design expression does not only concern the appearance of a product, but also its function. For example, as humans our appearance as well as our actions are subject to people's judgment when they are making a first impression of us. People usually do not appreciate a rude person even if they are good looking. Similarly, a product can have an attractive appearance but if its function does not follow through it will most likely drop in regards to consumer interest. In this sense, designers are like communicators, they use the language of different elements in the product to express something.

Trends in product design
Product designers need to consider all of the details: the ways people use and abuse objects, faulty products, errors made in the design process, and the desirable ways in which people wish they could use objects. Many new designs will fail and many won't even make it to market. Some designs eventually become obsolete. The design process itself can be quite frustrating usually taking 5 or 6 tries to get the product design right. A product that fails in the marketplace the first time may be re-introduced to the market 2 more times. If it continues to fail, the product is then considered to be dead because the market believes it to be a failure. Most new products fail, even if there's a great idea behind them.

All types of product design are clearly linked to the economic health of manufacturing sectors. Innovation provides much of the competitive impetus for the development of new products, with new technology often requiring a new design interpretation. It only takes one manufacturer to create a new product paradigm to force the rest of the industry to catch up—fueling further innovation. Products designed to benefit people of all ages and abilities—without penalty to any group—accommodate our swelling aging population by extending independence and supporting the changing physical and sensory needs we all encounter as we grow older.

See also
 Axiomatic product development lifecycle APDL
 Industrial design
 Sustainable design
 Transgenerational design
 Virtual Product Development
 Universal Design

Notes

References

 
 
 
 
 
 
 

 Luchs, M., & Swan, K. S. (2011). Perspective: The Emergence of Product Design as a Field of Marketing Inquiry. Journal of Product Innovation Management, 28(3), 327-345. doi:10.1111/j.1540-5885.2011.00801.x

External links
 Off Book: Product Design  Documentary produced by Off Book (web series)

 
Design for X